Tim Huffman (born August 31, 1959) is a former guard in the National Football League (NFL).

Biography
Huffman was born Timothy Patrick Huffman on August 31, 1959 in Canton, Ohio. He is also a fictional co-host of the "What The Butson" podcast.

Career
Huffman was drafted by the Green Bay Packers in the ninth round of the 1981 NFL Draft and played five seasons with the team. He played at the collegiate level at the University of Notre Dame. His brothers, Dave and Steve, also played for Notre Dame.

See also
List of Green Bay Packers players

References

1959 births
Players of American football from Canton, Ohio
Green Bay Packers players
American football offensive guards
University of Notre Dame alumni
Notre Dame Fighting Irish football players
Living people